Oru Small Family is a 2010 Malayalam film directed by Rajasenan, starring Rajasenan, Seetha, Kailash and Ananya.

Plot
The film revolves around two families, one that became rich by making illicit liquor and the other, of a sub-registrar played by Rajasenan, who tries to fight liquor consumption in the society. Seetha plays the wife of Rajasenan in this film. The boy (Kailash) from the first family falls in love with the sub-registrar's daughter, played by Ananya.

Cast

Soundtrack
The music of the film is given by M. Jayachandran. The lyrics are by Anil Panachooran and Rajeev Alunkal. The film has three songs sung by Vijay Yesudas, Chinmayi, Jassie Gift, Pradeep Palluruthy and Achu Rajamani.

References

External links
 Kerala9 article
 OneIndia article
 MalluMovies article

2010 films
2010 comedy films
2010s Malayalam-language films
Films scored by M. Jayachandran
Films directed by Rajasenan